Senad Rizvanović (April 24, 1968) is a Yugoslav former wrestler who competed in the 1992 Summer Olympics as an independent participant and won 8th place.

References

1968 births
Living people
Olympic wrestlers as Independent Olympic Participants
Wrestlers at the 1992 Summer Olympics
Serbian male sport wrestlers
European Wrestling Championships medalists